Epascestria pustulalis is a species of moth in the family Crambidae. It is found in large parts of Europe, except Ireland, Great Britain, Norway, Finland, Denmark, the Benelux, France, Switzerland, Portugal, Slovenia and Croatia. It is also present in the Near East, including Lebanon and Turkey.

The wingspan is 17–20 mm.

The larvae feed on Anchusa officinalis, Anchusa strigosa and Echium species. They mine the leaves of their host plant. The mine has the form of a large, full depth, brownish, inflated blotch, mostly positioned against the midrib. The frass is deposited in the central part of the mine. Pupation takes place within the mine. Larvae have a grey body and a black head. They can be found in May.

References

Moths described in 1823
Odontiini
Moths of Europe
Moths of Asia